The Men's China Squash Open 2015 is the men's edition of the 2015 China Squash Open, which is a tournament of the PSA World Tour event International (Prize money : 100 000 $). The event took place in Shanghai in China from 3 September to 6 September. Grégory Gaultier won his first China Squash Open trophy, beating Marwan El Shorbagy in the final.

Prize money and ranking points
For 2015, the prize purse was $100,000. The prize money and points breakdown is as follows:

Seeds

Draw and results

See also
 PSA World Tour 2015
 China Squash Open
 Women's China Squash Open 2015

References

External links
 PSA China Squash Open 2015 website
 China Squash Open 2015 SquashSite website

Squash tournaments in China
China Squash Open
Squash Open